Spring Valley Summit is a mountain pass in the western United States in southwestern Idaho, at an elevation of  above sea level. North of the city of Boise, it is traversed by State Highway 55, the Payette River Scenic Byway.

It marks the divide between the Payette River and Boise River drainage areas.

The new multi-lane grade of Highway 55 into Horseshoe Bend was completed in the fall of 1991; the old curvier road is to the west, long plagued by landslides and closures. Part of an ancient lake, dozens of springs fed water and undermined the roadway.

Of the major grades from Boise to north Idaho, it was the last to be improved. The other three, all on U.S. 95, were White Bird Hill (1975), Lapwai Canyon (1960), and Lewiston Hill (1977).

The north side of the summit is also known as Horseshoe Bend Hill.

References

External links
Visit Idaho.org - official state tourism site
Idaho Transportation Dept. - web-cam - Horseshoe Bend Hill (Spring Valley Summit)
"Bread Loaf Rock", a local landmark in the valley between the roads, facing the older routing

Mountain passes of Idaho
Landforms of Boise County, Idaho
Transportation in Boise County, Idaho